The Hartwick Hawks men's soccer team represents Hartwick College as member of the Empire 8 in NCAA Division III. The Hawks play their home matches on Elmore Field located on the Hartwick campus in Oneonta, New York. The team is coached by John Scott, the seventh head coach in the program's long history. The Hawks were distinguished by being the only Division III program playing Division I men's soccer as an affiliate member of the Sun Belt Conference and by having won the 1977 NCAA Division I Men's Soccer Championship. However, on February 28, 2018, Hartwick announced that the men's soccer program would be moving from D1 to D3.

History
Hartwick men's soccer was started by Hal Greig in 1956, three years before the NCAA began sanctioning the sport. Building slowly, Greig headed the program for four years, leading the Hawks to their first two winning seasons.

Greig was succeeded by David Haase, who in seven seasons had five winning teams, two more with .500 records, and led the Hawks to their first two NCAA Men's Soccer Championship tournaments in 1962 and 1964.

Al Miller headed the program for six seasons, leading the Hawks to five NCAA Tournaments, including their first College Cup placing third in 1970. Miller was coach when, in 1972, the NCAA Division II Men's Soccer Championship was begun. Hartwick, along with many other "non-major" schools, moved into the new division. Following that season, Miller was hired away into the ranks of professional soccer.

After only one season in DII, Hartwick and several other of the more prominent DII soccer programs moved back to Division I. Timo Liekoski headed the program for three seasons, gaining three NCAA tournaments, and a second third-place finish in 1974 before he, too, was hired away to the pros.

Liekoski was succeeded by Jim Lennox, who remained at the Hartford helm for twenty-seven seasons. Under Lennox, the Hawks advanced to thirteen NCAA tournaments, five College Cups, and the 1977 NCAA Championship. By the time Lennox departed Hartwick for the NSCAA, several of the "major" athletic conferences had come to emphasize soccer, and the non-major soccer independents like Hartwick were largely overtaken by big-budget major schools. While Lennox's teams made the NCAA tournament in eleven of his first twelve seasons, they made only three of his last fifteen, including missing during each of his last seven seasons at Hartwick. In 2000, Hartwick left the ranks of the independent schools, joining the Atlantic Soccer Conference (ASC). In 2002, Lennox quit the Hartwick post unexpectedly to become Director of Coaching Education for the National Soccer Coaches Association of America (NSCAA). For his work at Hartwick and the NSCAA, he was named to the NSCAA Hall of Fame in 2013.

Ian McIntyre followed Lennox. His Hawks had five winning seasons in seven years. They won the ASC regular season and tournament titles in 2005, putting Hartwick in the NCAA tournament for the first time in ten years. In 2007, Hartwick became an affiliate member of the Mid-American Conference (MAC).

Hartwick has been coached by John Scott since 2010. In 2013, the MAC eliminated affiliate members, and Hartwick became an affiliate of the Sun Belt Conference, which added men's soccer in 2014 for the first time since 1995. In the first season in the Sun Belt, while having an overall record of only 6–10–4, the Hawks went 3-1-1 in conference competition to win the regular season championship, then won the conference tournament to advance to the NCAA tournament for the first time since 2005. Building on that success, the 2015 Hawks were 11–6–3, repeating as conference champions at 5–0–0, winning their second conference tournament, and earning successive NCAA tournament spots for the first time since 1986–87.

Hartwick was playing Division I men's soccer and awarding athletic scholarships to soccer players before the NCAA initiated the non-scholarship Division III in 1974–75. Several other schools that moved into Division III also were awarding scholarships in ice hockey, lacrosse, or volleyball. These schools (originally nine, now eight) were "grandfathered" into Division I in their one sport as long as they had sport from the other gender (usually a women's program) also in D1 to meet Title IX requirements (Hartwick chose to start a D1 women's polo program, but eliminated the program when it moved the men's soccer program back to D3 in February 2018).

Roster

Record by year
Sources

References

External links
 

Hartwick Hawks men's soccer
1956 establishments in New York (state)
Association football clubs established in 1956